Duane Keith Galloway (born November 7, 1961) is a former American football cornerback in the National Football League. He played for the Detroit Lions. He played college football for the Arizona State Sun Devils.

References

1961 births
Living people
American football cornerbacks
Detroit Lions players
Arizona State Sun Devils football players
Ed Block Courage Award recipients